Samar is a 1962 film. It was written and directed by and stars George Montgomery. It also starred Gilbert Roland.

Plot

Cast
George Montgomery as Dr. John David Saunders
Gilbert Roland as Col. Juan Sebastian Salazar
Ziva Rodann as Ana Orteiz
Joan O'Brien as Cecile Salazar
Nico Minardos as Capt. De Guzman
Mario Barri as Sgt. Nanding
Henry Feist as Tominsino
Tony Fortich as Trustee
Johnny Cortez as Adring
Carmen Austin as School Teacher
Esperanza Garcia as Injured Woman
Danilo Jurado as Trustee (as Danny Jurado)
Luciano Lasam as Trustee
Pedro Faustino as Lasar
Joaquin Fajardo as Spanish Soldier
Pamela Saunders as Woman Convict (as Pam Saunders)
Rita Moreno as Woman Convict

References

External links

Samar at TCMDB
Samar at Letterbox DVD

1962 films
American adventure films
Philippine adventure films
Warner Bros. films
1962 adventure films
Films set in Samar
Films set in 1870
1960s English-language films
1960s American films